Omiostola hemeropis is a species of moth of the family Tortricidae. It is found in Colombia and Ecuador (Cotopaxi Province, Carchi Province, Bolívar Province, Pichincha Province). Omiostola macrotrachela was synonymized with O. hemeropis by Razowski and Becker, 2016.

References

Moths described in 1912
Moths of South America
Olethreutini
Taxa named by Paul Dognin